On May 19, 2020 and November 3, 2020, elections were held in Portland, Oregon, to elect the mayor.

In Portland local elections, all voters are eligible to participate. All candidates are listed on the ballot without any political party affiliation. All candidates meeting the qualifications competed in a blanket primary election on Tuesday, May 19, 2020. As no candidate received an absolute majority, a runoff election between the top two candidates was scheduled for Tuesday, November 3, 2020. Voters could also choose to write-in candidates.

In the General Election, Portland voters also elected members of their City Commission and voted on local ballot initiatives.

Candidates

Candidates who advanced to runoff

Candidates eliminated in the first round

Candidates who received fewer than 1,000 votes 

 Willie Banks, community advocate
 Jarred Bepristis, bartender
 Daniel Hoffman, homeless rights activist
 Lew Humble, retired mechanic, perennial candidate
 Michael Jenkins, cannabis grower
 Sharon Joy, retired community advocate
 Floyd LaBar, yoga teacher
 Beryl McNair, retired Federal government employee, candidate for Portland Mayor in 2008
 Michael O'Callaghan, homeless rights activist and candidate for Alaska governor in 1990
 Mark White, program manager
 Michael Burleson, community leader, activist, attorney at law (Suspended)

Declined to run 

 Diego Hernandez, representative for Oregon's 47th House district
Jessica Vega Pederson, Multnomah County commissioner

Endorsements

Polling

Runoff

Results

Primary

Runoff 
Since no candidate received a simple majority (50% plus one) vote in the primary election, the two candidates who received the most votes (Wheeler and Iannarone) ran again in the general election on November 3, 2020.  Iannarone, who had finished third in the 2016 mayoral election, was campaigning on a progressive platform emphasizing urbanism and taking a stronger stand against police violence.

The police murder of George Floyd and resulting protests occurred only two weeks after the first round of the mayoral election, and led to significant protest activity in Portland that continued throughout 2020. These events led supporters of third-place candidate Teressa Raiford to begin mounting a write-in campaign on her behalf, arguing that she more authentically represented the energy of the street protests.

Wheeler won the election, becoming Portland's first mayor to win a second consecutive term since Vera Katz left office in 2005. Ultimately, almost 48,000 write-in votes were cast in the election, far exceeding Wheeler's approximately 20,000-vote margin of victory.

Notes

Partisan clients

References

External links

City of Portland Resources
 Registry of Candidates – May 19, 2020 Primary Election
 Open and Accountable Elections Program: 2020 Qualifying Candidates

Candidate Campaign Websites
 Sarah Iannarone for Portland Mayor
 Ted Wheeler for Portland Mayor

Interviews
 Portland Mayor’s Race Pits Wheeler Against Two Prominent Community Activists

Mayoral election
2020 Oregon elections
Portland, Oregon
2020